Bambusa copelandii is a species of Bambusa bamboo.

Synonyms

Distribution 
Bambusa copelandii is endemic to Myanmar.

Description 

Bambusa copelandii  grows up to a height of 1,500 to 2,000 meters. Its stem is woody and grows up to 15–19 cm. Its 6 stamens are yellow and grow up to  8 mm long.

References 

copelandii
Flora of Myanmar